Klinger may refer to:

 Klinger (surname), a list of people with the surname
 Corporal Klinger, a character from M*A*S*H
 Klinger (horse), owned by the US Army
 Klinger (band), an Australia band from 1996 to 2003
 Klinger Ridge, Marie Byrd Land, Antarctica
 Klinger Lake, near Klingers, Michigan, United States
 22369 Klinger, a main-belt asteroid

See also 
 Clinger (disambiguation)
 Klingers, Michigan, United States, an unincorporated community
 Jan Klingers (1929–1994), Dutch sprint canoer
 Klingerstown, Pennsylvania